Michurinsky is a rural locality (a settlement) in Mikhaylovskoye Rural Settlement, Paninsky District, Voronezh Oblast, Russia. The population was 258 as of 2010. There are 5 streets.

Geography 
Michurinsky is located 11 km southeast of Panino (the district's administrative centre) by road. Sergeyevka is the nearest rural locality.

References 

Rural localities in Paninsky District